Frank Thrall Weatherwax (June 23, 1902 – December 17, 1991) was an American actor and animal trainer. He is best remembered with his brother Rudd Weatherwax for their famous collie, Pal, the dog who became famous as Lassie in the 1943 Metro-Goldwyn-Mayer film Lassie Come Home. He also trained the dog, Lightning, for the 1935 movie A Dog of Flanders.

Animal training 
Weatherwax was born in Camp Palomas, New Mexico Territory, the son of Anna Elisa (née Wallis) and Walter Smiley Weatherwax. Weatherwax trained the original Asta for The Thin Man, a film produced in 1934. This movie had five sequels and an accompanying television show. Weatherwax's Asta did not star in the TV series. He also trained Spike, who appeared in Disney's Old Yeller and in other film and television programs. Weatherwax played a bully in Little Lord Fauntleroy in 1921 with Mary Pickford. In 1920 he appeared in the silent film version of Heidi and in The Jucklins.

Family
He was the brother of Rudd Weatherwax, actor and animal trainer, and uncle of actor Ken Weatherwax.

Notes

External links
 
 Profile, canineprofessionals.com

1902 births
1991 deaths
American male silent film actors
Dog trainers
Male actors from New Mexico
People from Sierra County, New Mexico
20th-century American male actors